"Beat Boy" is a 1984 song by the British pop band Visage, released as a single in November 1984.

The track was taken as the second single from Visage's third album, Beat Boy, and became the band's last single before they split up in 1985. The single was a commercial failure and did not chart.

Music video
The music video was directed by Jean-Claude Luyat and shot in Africa, as a part of a full-length video incorporating songs from The Anvil and Beat Boy. It pictures dancing tribes and Steve Strange traveling across savanna. The clip was later included on the Visage video album in 1986.

Track listings
 7" single (1984)
A. "Beat Boy" – 3:30
B. "Beat Boy" (Dub) – 3:48

 12" single (1984)
A. "Beat Boy" (Dance Mix) – 7:15
B. "Beat Boy" (Dance Dub) – 5:23

 12" promotional single (1984)
A. "Beat Boy" (Machine Mix (10 Min) Dance Mix) – 9:54
B. "Beat Boy" ((10 Min) Dance Mix) – 8:45

Personnel
Steve Strange — vocals
Rusty Egan — drums, electronic drums programming
Steve Barnacle — bass
Dave Formula — synthesizer
Andy Barnett — guitar
Marsha Raven — backing vocals
Karen Ramsey — backing vocals
Rose Patterson — backing vocals

References

1984 singles
Visage (band) songs
Songs written by Steve Strange
Songs written by Rusty Egan
Songs written by Dave Formula
1984 songs
Polydor Records singles